Chathill is a railway station on the East Coast Main Line, which runs between  and . It is owned by Network Rail and managed by Northern Trains.

History 
The station was opened by the Newcastle and Berwick Railway on 29 March 1847. At the time of opening, four passenger trains ran each way every weekday between Newcastle and Morpeth, and between Chathill and Tweedmouth. Road coaches filled in the gaps for the time being, and a four-hour transit from Newcastle to Berwick-upon-Tweed was achieved.

Between 1 August 1898 and 27 October 1951, the station served as the south-western terminus of the North Sunderland Railway, which ran between Chathill and the fishing village of Seahouses. The railway operated independently, until takeover by the London and North Eastern Railway in 1939.

An average of 3 or 4 stopping services each way per day ran between Newcastle and Edinburgh Waverley via Berwick-upon-Tweed until the late 1980s. Following the electrification of the East Coast Main Line, these services were curtailed at Berwick-upon-Tweed. Services were further reduced to their current level by British Rail in May 1991, due to a shortage of rolling stock.

Owing to the limited service (two trains per day towards Morpeth and Newcastle), an easement permits passengers travelling north towards Berwick-upon-Tweed and Scotland to double back via Alnmouth for Alnwick. The local rail user group SENRUG has been campaigning since September 2016 to have local services on the corridor between Newcastle and Edinburgh Waverley increased, to offer more choice for commuters and offer leisure opportunities for visitors to locations such as Lindisfarne and St Cuthbert's Way.

The station has retained its Grade II listed building and signal box on the northbound platform, though neither is in operational use. The station house is now privately owned and the signal box houses signalling equipment.

Facilities
The station is unstaffed and has no ticket facilities, so intending passengers must buy tickets on the train or prior to travel. There is a large stone waiting shelter on the southbound platform, but there are no other amenities other than information posters on each side. Step-free access is available to both platforms.

Services 

Services at Chathill are operated by Northern Trains using  and  DMUs.

The station is currently served by two trains per day (one in the morning and one in the evening) to  via . Both services on weekdays and the morning service on Saturdays continue beyond Newcastle to  via .

No services call at the station on Sundays.

References

Sources 

Wright, A., (1988), The North Sunderland Railway, The Oakwood Press, Locomotion Papers No. 36,

External links 

Railway stations in Northumberland
DfT Category F2 stations
Former North Eastern Railway (UK) stations
Former North Sunderland Railway stations
Railway stations in Great Britain opened in 1847
Northern franchise railway stations
1847 establishments in England
John and Benjamin Green buildings and structures